Philadelphia is the center of economic activity in both Pennsylvania and the four-state Delaware Valley metropolitan region of the United States. Philadelphia’s close geographical and transportation connections to other large metropolitan economies along the Eastern Seaboard of the United States have been cited as offering a significant competitive advantage for business creation and entrepreneurship. Five Fortune 500 companies are headquartered in the city. , the Philadelphia metropolitan area was estimated to produce a gross metropolitan product (GMP) of US$479 billion, an increase from the $445 billion calculated by the Bureau of Economic Analysis for 2017, representing the ninth largest U.S. metropolitan economy. Philadelphia was rated by the GaWC as a 'Beta' city in its 2016 ranking of world cities.

Philadelphia has shifted to an information technology and service-based economy. Financial activities account for the largest sector of the metro economy, and it is one of the largest health education and research centers in the United States. The city is also home to the Philadelphia Stock Exchange, owned by NASDAQ. Philadelphia's history attracts many tourists, with the Liberty Bell receiving over 2 million visitors in 2010.

Economic sectors 

Philadelphia's economic sectors include higher education, manufacturing, oil refining, food processing, health care and biotechnology, telecommunications, tourism and financial services.

Federal presence 

The federal government has several facilities in Philadelphia. The city served as the capital city of the United States, before the construction of Washington, D.C. Today, the East Coast operations of the United States Mint are based near the historic district, and the Federal Reserve Bank's Philadelphia division is based there as well. Philadelphia is also home to the U.S. District Court for the Eastern District of Pennsylvania and the U.S. Court of Appeals for the Third Circuit.

Fortune 500 corporations 

The Delaware Valley contains the headquarters of twelve Fortune 500 corporations, four of which are in Philadelphia proper.

The Philadelphia Stock Exchange, acquired by NASDAQ in 2007, tracks the Philadelphia Semiconductor Index, known in financial circles as the SOX. The city is home to the headquarters of cable television and internet service provider Comcast, insurance companies Cigna, Colonial Penn, and Independence Blue Cross, food services company Aramark, chemical makers FMC Corporation and Rohm and Haas, pharmaceutical companies GlaxoSmithKline, Amicus Therapeutics, Spark Therapeutics, apparel retailers Five Below and Urban Outfitters, and its subsidiary Anthropologie, automotive parts retailer Pep Boys, and stainless steel producer Carpenter Technology Corporation. Other corporation headquarters in the city include Crown Holdings and Brandywine Realty Trust. The headquarters of Boeing Rotorcraft Systems and its main rotorcraft factory are in the Philadelphia suburb of Ridley Park; The Vanguard Group and the U.S. headquarters of Siemens Healthineers are headquartered in Malvern, Pennsylvania, a Philadelphia suburb; healthcare conglomerate AmerisourceBergen is headquartered in suburban Conshohocken, Pennsylvania; and the Campbell Soup Company and automobile manufacturer Subaru USA are headquartered across the Delaware River in adjacent Camden, New Jersey.

Rail transit 

With the historic presence of the Pennsylvania Railroad, and the large ridership at 30th Street Station, Amtrak maintains a significant presence in the city. These jobs include customer service representatives and ticket processing and other behind-the-scenes personnel, in addition to the normal functions of the railroad.

Legal sector 
The city is home to the law schools of Temple, Penn, and Drexel, and the metro area includes Rutgers (Camden), Villanova, and Widener.

The headquarters of the American Law Institute (publisher of Restatements of the Law) is located in the city as are the federal Third Circuit Court of Appeals and Eastern District of Pennsylvania.

Ten of the 100 largest law firms in the US have their headquarters or largest office in Philadelphia.

Medical facilities 

Philadelphia is an important center for medicine, a distinction that it has held since the colonial period. The city is home to the first hospital in the British North American colonies, Pennsylvania Hospital, and the first medical school in what is now the United States, at the University of Pennsylvania (Penn). Penn, the city's largest private employer, also runs a large teaching hospital and extensive medical system. There are also major hospitals affiliated with Temple University School of Medicine, Drexel University College of Medicine, Thomas Jefferson University (Thomas Jefferson University Hospital), and Philadelphia College of Osteopathic Medicine. Philadelphia also has three distinguished children's hospitals: Children's Hospital of Philadelphia, the nation's first pediatric hospital (located adjacent to the Hospital of the University of Pennsylvania), St. Christopher's Hospital, and the Shriners' Hospital. In the city's northern section are Albert Einstein Medical Center, and in the northeast section, Fox Chase Cancer Center. Together, health care is the largest sector of employment in the city. Several medical professional associations are headquartered in Philadelphia.

With Philadelphia's importance as a medical research center, the region supports the pharmaceutical industry. GlaxoSmithKline, AstraZeneca, Wyeth, Merck, GE Healthcare, Johnson and Johnson and Siemens Medical Solutions are just some of the large pharmaceutical companies with operations in the region. The city is also home to the nation's first school of pharmacy, the Philadelphia College of Pharmacy, now called the University of the Sciences in Philadelphia.

Tourism 
Tourism is a major industry in Philadelphia, which was the 11th-most-visited city in the United States in 2008. It welcomed 710,000 visitors from foreign countries in 2008, up 29% from the previous year.

Shopping 

Shopping options in Center City include Fashion District Philadelphia, The Shops at Liberty Place, Jewelers' Row, South Street, Old City's 3rd Street Corridor, and a wide variety of standalone independent retailers. The Rittenhouse area, known as Philadelphia's outdoor shopping mall, includes Rittenhouse Row, a four-block section of Walnut Street, which has higher-end clothing chain stores and some hipster-inspired clothing stores. The parallel streets of Sansom and Chestnut have some high-end boutiques and clothing retailers. Old City, especially the 3rd Street corridor, has locally owned independent boutiques and art/design galleries. Midway between Old City and Broad Street is the Reading Terminal Market, with dozens of take-out restaurants, specialty food vendors, and small grocery store operators, a few of which are operated by Amish farmers from nearby Lancaster County.

Philadelphia has a few eclectic neighborhood shopping districts, which generally consist of a few blocks along a major neighborhood thoroughfare, such as in Manayunk or Chestnut Hill. The Italian Market in South Philadelphia offers groceries, meats, cheeses and housewares, historically from Italy, but now from many nationalities. Two famed cheesesteak restaurants, Geno's and Pat's, are located nearby.

There are several large shopping malls and strip malls in the region, including Philadelphia Mills in Northeast Philadelphia, and many in the suburbs, most notably the King of Prussia mall in King of Prussia, Pennsylvania,  from the heart of the city. The King of Prussia mall is the largest shopping mall on the U.S. East Coast and the largest in the country in terms of leasable retail space.

Innovation 

During the 20th century, the city was a focal point of retail innovation. Suburban Square in Ardmore, Montgomery County, is sometimes considered the first modern shopping center in the world. Built in stages from 1927 to 1931, it was one of the first institutions to define the Philadelphia Main Line in the 1920s. More importantly, it contains one of the oldest surviving department store branches in the country, a Strawbridge & Clothier, now a Macy's as of recently. Since then, large malls such as Cherry Hill Mall and King of Prussia have opened nearby.

Some of the first modern discount stores followed. Much of Kmart's earlier growth was in the Philadelphia area during the early 1960s. Defunct chains such as Bradlees, Caldor, Jamesway, Ames, Woolco, Two Guys, Hills Department Stores, Zayre, Richway, Korvettes, Nichols, Gaylords, Murphy Mart, and later Value City were concentrated in Philadelphia and other East Coast markets. This growth occurred largely during the 1950s–1970s, before the national growth of Wal-Mart and Target in the 1980s. Another was Strawbridge's own, Clover.

Philadelphia was the home of many pioneering supermarket chains during the same period, many of which had trademark architecture. The longest-running of these is Acme, formerly known as American Stores and Super Saver. Other examples are long-defunct Food Fair (Pantry Pride) and Penn Fruit, but Acme has closed many stores and was sold to Albertsons. They have however acquired many stores from their failed rivals. A&P, based in New York City, once had Philadelphia as a core market. After many previous store closings, the company shuttered its entire Philadelphia division in 1982. Due to a union outcry, it built some new stores and reopened others as Super Fresh from 1982 to 1985. The A&P name lives on in the nearby New York/New England market. More recently, the company acquired established Philadelphia/New York chain Pathmark. Many of these stores that have closed were replaced by franchises such as Shur-Fine, Supervalu, IGA, and Thriftway/Shop 'n Bag. Many other former supermarkets have become off-price stores such as Big Lots, Family Dollar, and Dollar General. Current major players in the region today include ShopRite, Save-a-Lot, Aldi, Giant-Carlisle, and local chain Genuardi's. Failed family-owned chains are Clemens and Giunta's. Newer upscale chains include Whole Foods, Wegmans, and Trader Joe's. There are few Wal-Mart Supercenters in the immediate area. In nearby markets, Safeway, Stop & Shop, Giant-Landover, Kroger, Food Lion, and formerly Grand Union operate.

Drug chains CVS, Rite Aid, and formerly Eckerd and Drug Emporium are common in the region. JCPenney also for many years operated the leading Thrift Drug chain. All these chains often anchored shopping centers along with a supermarket. Acme for many years also owned "Rea & Derick" drugstores under this arrangement, in partnership with the Rexall chain. In recent decades, supermarkets have added pharmacies of their own. At the same time, drugstores have relocated to corner locations or "inherited" obsolete supermarkets. Similar trends have occurred in other cities. Food Fair/Pantry Pride and Stop & Shop also shared many shopping centers with subsidiaries J.M. Fields and Bradlees, often with the stores directly connected. In fact, both divisions were acquired the same year, in 1961. Several J.M. Fields stores gave way to Bradlees as well. There once were many small enclosed malls in the area with a similar style, such as MacDade Mall.

Pennsylvania is also unique in that it has a "State Store" system for non-beer alcohol sales. Wine and spirits are only sold at stores operated by the Pennsylvania Liquor Control Board, which are ubiquitous in Philadelphia. For many years, these stores were called "State Store", only had "counter" service, and were strictly closed on Sundays. Many of them were and still are small but important anchors in shopping centers. In the 1970s, all but a few "urban" locations were made into conventional stores with aisles. Later, their hours, selection, and square footage have greatly been expanded. To this day, however, the stores lack a consistent name and logo. Some are called simply "liquor store", while most have some variation on the words "Wine & Spirits" or "Wine & Spirits Shoppe". The state also allows winery retail stores.

Also important to the local economy are Wawa, Comcast, Citizens Bank, Sunoco, and Lukoil. These companies all have many major sponsorships. Philadelphia has had its share of local retailers as well, many of which have been bought out or closed. Many national big-box and mall retailers have arrived since the 1980s.

Innovation firsts 
Philadelphia was the location of the first examples in the United States of a number of institutions, including:

 Advertising agency
 Art school & museum
 Botanical garden
 Cancer hospital
 De Facto Central Bank, Chartered by the Congress of the Confederation
 Central Bank, Chartered by the United States Congress
 Electronic computer
 Eye hospital
 Hospital
 Fire company
 Fire insurance company
 Labor union
 Medical school
 Mint
 Municipal water system
 Pediatric hospital
 Penitentiary
 Pharmacy school
 Post office
 Public library
 Savings bank
 Stock exchange
 Title insurance company
 University
 Zoo

See also 
 Outline of PhiladelphiaEconomy of Philadelphia
 Economy of Pennsylvania

References

External links 
 Philadelphia Department of Commerce website